Paul Franklin may refer to:

 Paul Franklin (American football) (1906–1959), running back for the Chicago Bears
 Paul Franklin (footballer) (born 1963), association football player and coach
 Paul Franklin (musician) (born 1954), American multi-instrumentalist and regular player with Mark Knopfler and Dire Straits
 Paul Franklin (visual effects supervisor), who gained recognition for work on the films The Dark Knight and Inception

See also
 Joseph Paul Franklin (1950–2013), American serial killer